IONISx  is a for-profit, educational technology company that offers massive open online courses (MOOCs) as well as online degrees and certifications. IONISx works with universities and other organizations to make some of their courses available online. IONISx was established in 2013, in collaboration with ISG Business School, ISEFAC Bachelor, EPITA, Epitech, IPSA, E-Artsup, Sup'Internet and ETNA.

References

External links 

French educational websites
Educational technology companies of France
Open educational resources
Companies based in Paris